Eduardo Gabriel dos Santos Filho, better known as Dida (Palmeira dos Índios, February 4, 1979) is retired right back.

Career
It was formed in the basic categories of Flamengo where he was still known as Eduardo. He played for Flamengo until 1999.

After leaving the red and black, was to defend the América-SP, in 2000, arriving the year after Brasiliense, which came to be called only by Dida.

In 2004, the Brazilian played for Guarani, returning in 2005 to the alligator to be cast that would be demoted to Serie B.

He played for Atlético Goianiense and the series B by América de Natal.

In 2009, the league Dida played at Santa Helena, Goiás.

In 2010, Dida returned to Atlético Goianiense, and plays with the number 13 shirt.

References

External links
Flapédia
ogol

1979 births
Living people
Brazilian footballers
Association football defenders
Sportspeople from Alagoas
Campeonato Brasileiro Série A players
Campeonato Brasileiro Série B players
Centro Sportivo Alagoano players
CR Flamengo footballers
América Futebol Clube (SP) players
Brasiliense Futebol Clube players
Atlético Clube Goianiense players
Botafogo de Futebol e Regatas players
Itumbiara Esporte Clube players
Santa Helena Esporte Clube players
Botafogo Futebol Clube (SP) players
Clube Recreativo e Atlético Catalano players
Clube do Remo players
Paragominas Futebol Clube players
Clube Sociedade Esportiva players